Mithila Makhaan is a Maithili language film directed by Nitin Chandra that stars Anurita Jha, Kranti Prakash Jha and Pankaj Jha.

Udit Narayan, Hariharan, Suresh Wadkar, Sonu Nigam have provided playback voices for songs in the movie.

The movie has won Best Maithili Film in the 63rd National Film Awards under the language section. It is the first ever Maithili film from Bihar and Jharkhand to get a national award. Apart from winning Best Film in Maithili, "Mithila Makhaan" was also officially selected for International Film Festival of South Asia (IFFSA) in Toronto in May, 2016, Jagran Film Festival - 2016 and National Film Festival - 2016 organised by the Ministry of Information and Broadcasting in New Delhi and NFAI, Pune. The film is high budget production with filming in US, Canada, India and Nepal. It was shot in a temperature of -35 °C in Canada and +45 °C in India and Nepal.

Cast
Kranti Prakash Jha as Kranti Prakash
Anurita Jha as Maithili
Pankaj Jha as Brahmha
Prashant Rana
Saket Kumar Mishra as Maithili's Brother

Production
Mithila Makhaan was produced by Samir Kumar ( IIT, IIM, ex IAS-allied, Investment Banker) and Champaran Talkies, production house of actress entrepreneur actress-entrepreneur Neetu Chandra's and her brother Nitin Neera Chandra who is director of the film. The initial idea of the movie came to the director when he was working with an NGO during the 2008 Kosi floods and he was thinking of the need for people to find work in other countries.

In April 2015, team was really demotivated after finishing the shooting in Bihar. Director and DOP were of the opinion to let the film remain in the box. Producer, Samir Kumar, took the bold call to further invest and complete the film as originally planned. Further he had set a deadline to submit the film for National Awards after obtaining necessary Censor Certificate. The film went on to win the National Award.

Awards and recognition 
 National Film Awards for Best Maithili Film
 Official Selection For International Film Festival of South Asia at Toronto
 Screened at Patna International Film Festival
Screened at NFAI, Pune

References 

Films set in Bihar
Maithili-language films